How to Be Alone is a 2016 short Israeli student film, produced and directed by Erez Eisenstein. The script is an adaptation of a short story of the same name by Orna Coussin, first published in 2006.

The world premiere of the film took place in Palace of Culture and Science, on 16 April 2016, as part of Poland's LGBT Film Festival.

Plot
A brokenhearted lesbian woman (Nili Tserruya) grapples with her lonely existence as a singleton. She decides to walk on a different path than the majority. Tired by the constant struggle to fit in a perfectly happy society, she chooses to explore herself and teach herself how to embrace solitude and transgress the mundane world.

Cast
Main cast
 Nili Tserruya
 Ofri Fuchs
 Lia Friedman
 Or Ilan-Cohen
 Rami Baruch as the author

Extended cast
 Shlomi BiBi
 Addi Gefen
 Batzion Rogozinsky
 Mya Kaplan
 Mor Granit
 Maayan Shay

Festivals

Awards

References

External links
 How To Be Alone - official website
 
 

2016 films
Israeli short films
2010s Hebrew-language films
Israeli LGBT-related films
2016 LGBT-related films
Student films
2016 short films
Films based on short fiction